St. Mary's College is a high school in Sault Ste. Marie, Ontario, Canada. It was established in 1956 by Basilian priests as an all-boys Catholic high school on St. Georges Avenue. As the school grew in popularity and size, St. Mary's began admitting girls in September 1987. That same year, the school moved into a new building (the former location of Lakeway Collegiate & Vocational School or Sault Technical and Commercial High School) built in 1921 on Wellington Street. In 2015, St. Mary's College combined with St. Basil Secondary School in a brand new building located on Second Line East.

Notable alumni
 Matt D'Agostini – current NHL player
 Darnell Nurse – current NHL player
 Paul DiPietro – NHL player 1991-1997
 Brian Finley – NHL player 2005-2007
 Ron Francis – NHL player 1981-2004, two-time Stanley Cup Champion, both with the Pittsburgh Penguins
 Joe Fratesi – former Sault Ste. Marie Mayor, former Sault Ste. Marie CAO
 James Loney – peace activist who was held captive in Iraq for several months
 Carmen Provenzano – former Sault Ste. Marie MP
 Blake Speers – current NHL player
 Chris Thorburn – current NHL player
 Marty Turco – former NHL player
 Dennis Vial – NHL player 1990-1998
 Rake McGee – current NBA all-star, basketball pioneer

See also
List of high schools in Ontario

References

External links
St. Mary's College

High schools in Sault Ste. Marie, Ontario
Educational institutions established in 1956
Catholic secondary schools in Ontario
1956 establishments in Ontario